Diamonds on Wheels is a 1973 British family comedy film directed by Jerome Courtland and starring Peter Firth, Patrick Allen, George Sewell, Derek Newark, George Woodbridge and Barry Jackson. This was George woodbridge's last film and it was released 21 days before his death.

Cast 
Peter Firth as Robert "Bobby" Stewart 
Patrick Allen as Insp. Cook
George Sewell as Henry Stewart
Derek Newark as Mercer
Dudley Sutton as Finch
Barry Jackson as Wheeler
Christopher Malcolm as Jock
Richard Wattis as Sir Hilary Stanton
Allan Cuthbertson as Gus Ashley
Ambrosine Phillpotts as Lady Truesdale
Maggie Hanley as Mrs. Maggie Stewart
George Innes as Insp. Timothy
George Woodbridge as PC Andrew
Patrick Holt as Steward
Andrew McCulloch as Billy
Arthur Hewlett as Benjy
Patrick McAlliney as Junkman 
Mark Edwards as Whiteman
John Savident as Steward
Robin Langford as Peter Pitt
Spencer Banks as Charlie Todd
Cynthia Lund as Susan Stewart

External links 
 

1973 films
1973 comedy films
Walt Disney Pictures films
British comedy films
Films produced by Ron W. Miller
Films scored by Ron Goodwin
British auto racing films
1970s English-language films
1970s British films